John I of Antioch was Patriarch of Antioch (429–441). He led a group of moderate Eastern bishops during the Nestorian controversy. He is sometimes confused with John Chrysostom, who is occasionally also referred to as John of Antioch. John gave active support to his friend Nestorius in the latter's dispute with Cyril of Alexandria. In the year 431, he arrived too late for the opening meeting of the First Council of Ephesus. Cyril, suspecting John of using procrastinating tactics to support Nestorius, decided not to wait and convened the council without John and his supporters, condemning Nestorius. When John reached Ephesus a few days after the council had begun, he convened a counter-council which condemned Cyril and vindicated Nestorius.

Two years later, in 433 John reconciled with Cyril based on the Formula of Reunion, a theological formula devised as a compromise. In the process, John lost many of his own supporters within his patriarchate. Some of his letters are extant.

References

Sources 

 
  
 
 
 
 
 

Patriarchs of Antioch
Syrian archbishops
Ancient Christians involved in controversies
5th-century Byzantine bishops
5th-century archbishops
Nestorianism